This is a list of works by Japanese painter Fujishima Takeji (1867–1943).

See also
 Kuroda Seiki
 Aoki Shigeru
 Yōga
 Nihonga
 Japanese painting

Notes

References

Japanese paintings
Lists of works of art